The Phoenix is a German breed of long-tailed chicken. It derives from cross-breeding of imported long-tailed Japanese birds similar to the Onagadori with other breeds.

History 

A few delicate imported long-tailed Japanese birds were cross-bred with birds of other breeds including Combattant de Bruges, Krüper, Leghorn, Malay, Modern Game, Old English Game, Ramelsloher and Yokohama.

The Poultry Club of Great Britain decided in 1904 to group the German Phoenix and Yokohama breeds under the name Yokohama; the Phoenix is not recognised as a breed. The silver variety of the Phoenix was accepted into the American Poultry Association Standard of Perfection in 1965, and the gold in 1983. Black-breasted red was recognised in 2018. The Phoenix was first accepted in the Australian Poultry Standard in 2012, with any colour standardised in Old English Game accepted.

Characteristics 

The Onagadori is thought to have a recessive gene that prevents it from moulting each year in the usual way. This gene was not transferred to the Phoenix, so its tail does not reach the same remarkable lengths as that of the original Japanese stock. The tail may reach  or more.

References 

Chicken breeds
Chicken breeds originating in Germany